Johann, typically a male given name, is the German form of Iohannes, which is the Latin form of the Greek name Iōánnēs, itself derived from Hebrew name Yochanan in turn from its extended form , meaning "Yahweh is Gracious" or "Yahweh is Merciful". Its English language equivalent is John. It is uncommon as a surname.

People
People with the name Johann include:

A–K
 Johann Adam Hiller (1728–1804), German composer
 Johann Adam Reincken (1643–1722), Dutch/German organist
 Johann Adam Remele (died 1740), German court painter
 Johann Adolf I, Duke of Saxe-Weissenfels (1649–1697)
 Johann Adolph Hasse (1699-1783), German Composer
 Johann Altfuldisch (1911—1947), German Nazi SS concentration camp officer executed for war crimes
 Johann Andreas Eisenmenger (1654–1704), German Orientalist
 Johann Baptist Wanhal (1739–1813), Czech composer
 Johann Bernhard Fischer von Erlach (1656–1723), Austrian architect
 Johann Bernoulli (1667–1748), Swiss mathematician
 Johann Carl Fuhlrott (1803–1877), early German paleoanthropologist
 Johann Casimir of Simmern (1543–1592), German prince
 Johann Casimir, Duke of Saxe-Coburg (1564–1633)
 Johann Caspar Ferdinand Fischer (c. 1656–1746), German Baroque composer
 Johann Caspar Kerll (1627–1693), German Baroque composer and organist
 Johann Christian Bach (1735–1782), classical composer, son of Johann Sebastian, also known as "the London Bach"
 Johann David Heinichen (1683–1729), German Baroque composer and music theorist
 Johann David Köhler (1684–1755), German historian
 Johann Eck (1486–1543) German theologian
 Johann Esch (died 1523), one of the first two Lutheran martyrs
 Johann Evangelist Haydn (1743–1805), tenor singer, brother of Joseph and Michael Haydn
 Johann Friedrich Agricola (1720–1774), German musical theorist
 Johann Friedrich Reichardt (1752–1814), German composer
 Johann Fust (c. 1400–1466), German printer
 Johann Georg (disambiguation page)
 Johann Gerhard (1582–1637), Lutheran theologian
 Johann Gottfried Walther (1684–1748), German Baroque musician, Johann Sebastian's cousin
 Johann Gustav Stickel (1805–1896), German scholar
 Johann Hari (born 1979), English writer and journalist
 Johann Heermann (1585–1647), German poet
 Johann Heinrich Buttstett (1666–1727), German Baroque musician
 Johann (Falco) Hölzel (1957–1998), Austrian rock singer
 Johann Jakob Froberger (1616–1667), German Baroque musician
 Jóhann Jóhannsson (1969–2018), Icelandic composer
 Johann Kuhnau (1660–1722), German Baroque musician, predecessor of Johann Sebastian Bach as Thomaskantor
  (1703–1761), nephew of the preceding, a pupil of Bach

L–Z
 Johann Lafer (born 1957), Austrian television chef 
 Johann Lamont (born 1957), Scottish politician, leader of the Scottish Labour Party
 Johann Le Bihan (born 1979), retired French swimmer
 Johann Lindner (born 1959), retired Austrian hammer thrower
 Johann Lohel (1549–1622), archbishop of Prague
 Johann Ludwig Krebs (1713–1780), German Baroque musician and organist, student of Johann Sebastian Bach
 Johann Lukas Schönlein (1793–1864), German naturalist and professor of medicine
 Johann Martin Schleyer (1831–1912), German Catholic priest
 Johann Mattheson (1681–1764), German composer, a close friend of Georg Friedrich Händel
 Johann Nepomuk Hiedler (1807–1888), great-grandfather of Hitler
 Johann Nepomuk Hummel (1778–1837), Austrian composer
 Johann Pachelbel (1653–1706), German Baroque composer
 Johann Pauls (1908–1946), German SS concentration camp officer executed for war crimes
Johann Peter Kellner (1705–1772), German organist and composer
Johann Baptist Albin Rauter (1895–1949), executed Austrian Nazi SS war criminal
Johann-Georg Richert (1890–1946), German Nazi officer executed for war crimes
 Johann Gottlob Schmeisser (1751–1806), Canadian Lutheran minister
 Johann Rudolf Stadler (1605–1637), Swiss clock-maker
 Johann Schicht (1855–1907), German Bohemian entrepreneur
 Johann Schreck (1576–1630), German missionary and polymath
 Johann Sebastian Bach (1685–1750), German composer and musician of the Baroque period
 Johann Sebastian Paetsch (born 1964), American cellist
 Johann Stamitz (1717–1757), Czech composer
 Johann Strauss I (1804–1849), Austrian Romantic composer
 Johann Strauss II (1825–1899), Austrian composer of light music, son of the above
 Johann Strauss III (1864–1939), also known as Johann Eduard Strauss, Austrian composer, nephew of the above
 Johann Samuel Schwerdtfeger (1734-1803), Lutheran minister, the first in Upper Canada.  
 Johann Sziklai (born 1947), German poet and teacher
 Johann Tserclaes, Count of Tilly (1559-1632), Dutch Catholic field marshal
 Johann van Beethoven (c. 1739–1792), German musician, father of Ludwig van Beethoven
 Johann Carl Vogel (1932–2012), South African physicist
 Johann Weyer (1515–1588), Dutch physician
 Johann Wolfgang Dobereiner, German chemist 
 Johann Wolfgang von Goethe (1749–1832), German writer and statesman
 Johann Zacherl (1814–1888), Austrian inventor
 Johann Zarco (born 1990), French motorbike racer

Other uses
 Johann Kraus, fictional character in the Hellboy universe, featured in B.P.R.D. comic books, published by Dark Horse Comics
 Johann Mouse, American 1953 cartoon short subject
 St. Johann in Tirol, town in Tyrol, Austria
 Johann Trinity, a fictional character in the anime series Mobile Suit Gundam 00

See also
 Eoin
 Giovanni (name)
 Hans (name)
 Ioannis
 Ivan (name)
 Jaan (given name)
 Ján
 Janez (given name)
 Jantz
 Jean (disambiguation)
 João
 Johan (disambiguation)
 Jóhann
 Johannes
 Johanns
 John
 Jon
 Jón
 Jonathan (name)
 Juan
 Juhani
 Shawn (given name)
 Siôn
 Yannis
 Yohan (name)
 Yo-han
 All Wikipedia pages beginning with Johann

References

German masculine given names